The Sultanate of Maldives (Dhivehi: Dhivehi Raajje, "the country of the Dhivehi people") was an Islamic monarchy that controlled the Maldivian Archipelago for 815 years (1153-1968), with interruption.

Maldives was a Buddhist kingdom until its last monarch, King Dhovemi, converted to Islam in the year 1153; thereafter he also adopted the Muslim title and name Sultan Muhammad al-Adil. Six dynasties would rule over the Maldives until the Sultanate become elective in 1932.

From the 16th century, the Sultanate increasingly came under European influence, starting with a 15-year period of Portuguese rule. After the expulsion of the Portuguese, the Maldives became subject to Dutch hegemony before finally becoming a British protected state in 1796. Following an abortive attempt at establishing a republic in 1953, a short-lived breakaway state, and independence from the United Kingdom, the Sultanate was abolished following a successful referendum in 1968, and the Maldives became a republic.

History

Introduction of Islam
Prior to Islamic rule, the Maldives had been united under a Buddhist monarchy since the third century BCE. Maldivan exposure to Islam originated from Middle Eastern sailors and merchants; the Maldivan archipelago's strategic location in the Indian Ocean and abundance of cowrie shells, a popular currency, proved lucrative.

In 1153, Sunni Muslim visitor Abu al Bar-akat converted the last Buddhist monarch of the Maldives, King Dhovemi, to Islam. This would mark the beginning of the Sultanate. For the next four centuries, the Sultanate would experience an era of peace and prosperity as its important Indian Ocean location allowed it to trade with much of Asia and Africa.

Portuguese and Dutch hegemony
The Portuguese arrived in the Maldives in 1507 and forced Sultan Kalu Muhammad to deliver an annual tribute of coir rope. In 1558, a Portuguese garrison was established on Malé and the Sultan was overthrown. Thus, the Maldives were administered from Portuguese Goa for the next 15 years, during which Christianity was imposed on the locals. In 1573, a popular revolt led by Muhammad Thakurufaanu al-Auzam drove the Portuguese away from the islands and reestablished Maldivan sovereignty. The struggle against colonial rule left a lasting impression on the native Maldivians and was a formative moment in the realization of a Maldivan identity. The liberation of the Maldives is still celebrated as the national day of the country.

In the mid-seventeenth century, the Dutch would govern the Maldives from their colony of Dutch Ceylon. However, their form of rule was indirect; they did not involve themselves in the local affairs of the Sultanate.

British protection and dissolution
In 1796, the British Empire expelled the Dutch from Ceylon and included the Maldives as a British protected area. The status of the Maldivan sultanate as a British protectorate was confirmed in an 1887 agreement. Like the Dutch, the British left the local customs of the Maldivians alone, allowing independent internal administration of the islands. However, the British era was one in which the power and influence of the Sultan was progressively weakened; thus, the British encouraged the establishment of a constitutional monarchy.

In 1932, the first constitution of the Maldives was put into effect. It limited the absolute powers of the Sultan, created the People's Majlis, and made a number of reforms; however, fears that this constitution favored British officials rather than the Maldivian people resulted in the constitution being torn up by an angry mob. A second constitution was resultantly published in 1937, and a third constitution was created in 1953. This document dissolved the Sultanate, replacing it with a presidential republic under Mohamed Amin Didi.

This system proved unpopular, however, and Amin Didi was ousted and later killed by a mob. A referendum resulted in the restoration of the Sultanate in 1954.

In 1959, the three Southern atolls of the Maldives (Addu Atoll, Huvadhu Atoll, and Fuvahmulah) declared independence from the Sultanate of the Maldives and established the United Suvadive Republic. These atolls seceded over the issues of the centralization of power in Malé, restrictions on travel and trade, and the presence of the British military. The republic was reannexed into the Maldives in 1963.

In July 1965, the Maldives gained full independence from the United Kingdom. Three years later, a final referendum was held and resulted in the establishment of a presidential republic, putting an end to the 815-year-old Sultanate.

See also
Buddhism in the Maldives
List of Maldivian monarchs

Notes

References

Former sultanates
States and territories established in the 1150s
Maldives